SMS G37 was a 1913 Type Large Torpedo Boat (Großes Torpedoboot) of the Imperial German Navy during World War I, and the 13th ship of her class.

Construction

G37 was ordered from Germaniawerft in April 1914 as part of the 1914 order of high-seas torpedo-boats (with a half-flotilla of 6 ordered from Germaniawerft and a second half-flotilla from AG Vulcan). She was launched from Germaniawerft's Kiel shipyard on 17 December 1914 and commissioned on 29 June 1915. The "G" in G37 refers to the shipyard at which she was constructed.

Armament consisted of three 8.8 cm SK L/45 naval guns in single mounts, together with six 50 cm (19.7 in) torpedo tubes with two fixed single tubes forward and 2 twin mounts aft. Up to 24 mines could be carried. The ship had a complement of 87 officers and men.

Service
On 16–18 November 1915, G37, part of the Eleventh Torpedo Boat Half Flotilla, took part in operations by 18 torpedo boats in the Skagerrak to intercept merchant shipping. On 10 February 1916, G37 took part in a sortie by 25 torpedo boats of the 2nd, 6th and 9th Torpedo-boat Flotillas into the North Sea. The sortie led to an encounter between several German torpedo boats and British minesweepers off the Dogger Bank, which resulted in the British minesweeper  being torpedoed and sunk by ships of the 2nd Flotilla.

G37 was assigned to the Sixth Torpedo Boat Flotilla, Twelfth Half-Flotilla, of the High Seas Fleet at the Battle of Jutland. Early in the battle, she fell astern of the rest of her flotilla, because she had temporarily lost power from a boiler, and fired two torpedoes at British light cruisers at about 17:44 CET (i.e. 16:44 GMT). The 12th Half Flotilla attempted a torpedo attack against the battlecruisers of the British 3rd Battlecruiser Squadron at about 19:00 CET. None of the torpedoes from this attack, or one immediately afterwards from the 9th Flotilla, hit their targets. The battlecruiser  had been badly damaged by shells from British battlecruisers, and G37 was one of seven German torpedo boats tasked with escorting Lützow. Heavy flooding forced the crew of Lützow to abandon ship at 01:55 CET, 1 June. G40 was damaged by a shell from Champion and had to be taken under tow by G37.

On 18 August 1916, the High Seas Fleet sailed on a sortie to bombard Sunderland in order to draw out units of the British Fleet and destroy them. G37 formed part of the Seventh Torpedo Boat Flotilla, but no general fleet engagement took place, despite both the High Seas Fleet and the British Grand Fleet being at sea at the same time.

On 22 January 1917, 11 torpedo boats of the 6th Torpedo Boat Flotilla, including G37 left Helgoland to reinforce the German torpedo forces in Flanders. The British Admiralty knew about this transfer due to codebreaking by Room 40, and ordered the Harwich Force of cruisers and destroyers to intercept the German torpedo boats. During the night of 22–23 January, the 6th Flotilla encountered three British light cruisers (and ). The Germans attempted a torpedo attack against the British cruisers, but were driven off by heavy fire and broke off the attack behind a smoke-screen. , leader of the flotilla, was hit by three shells, one of which jammed her rudder, forcing her to move in a circle, resulting in  colliding with V69, badly damaging both torpedo boats, although both survived. The remainder of the flotilla, including G37, escaped unharmed and continued on to Flanders.

On the night of 25/26 February, the Flanders-based torpedo boats launched a three-pronged attack against Allied shipping in the English Channel and the Dover Barrage. Six ships of the 6th Flotilla, including G37 were to attack the Dover Barrage, while other torpedo boats were to attack shipping on The Downs and off the mouth of the River Maas. The 6th Flotilla ran into the British destroyer  which was patrolling the Barrage. While the German ships attacked Laverock with heavy gunfire and torpedoes (one of which hit the British destroyer but failed to explode), the British destroyer only received light damage, and the 6th Flotilla turned back for Zeebrugge, with the drifters of the Dover Barrage unharmed. The Flanders-based flotillas attacked again on the night of 17/18 March. Seven torpedo boats of the 6th Flotilla (G37,    and ) were to attack the Dover Barrage north of the Sandettie Bank, with five torpedo boats of the 1st Zeebrugge Half-Flotilla attacking south of the Sandettie Bank, and four ships of the 2nd Zeebrugge Half-Flotilla operating against the Downs. The 6th Flotilla met the British destroyer  on crossing the Dover Barrage. Paragon challenged the German torpedo boats, which replied with gunfire and torpedoes, Paragon being struck by torpedoes from S49 and G46 and sunk. The 12th Half-Flotilla (including G37) became separated from the rest of the 6th Flotilla and therefore returned to base, while the remaining three ships of the flotilla continued on, torpedoing and badly damaging the destroyer  before returning to base, while a merchant ship was sunk by the 2nd Zeebrugge Half-Flotilla east of the Downs. The 6th Flotilla returned to Germany on 29 March 1917.

Four sailors died in this incident.

References

 

 

 Technical specs of the Großes Torpedoboot 1913 class
 Germany's High Seas Fleet in the World War, Chapter 10c, published by Admiral Reinhard Scheer in 1920

Torpedo boats of the Imperial German Navy
1914 ships
Ships built in Kiel
World War I torpedo boats of Germany
Maritime incidents in 1917
Ships sunk by mines
World War I shipwrecks in the North Sea